The 2022 Florida Attorney General election took place on November 8, 2022, to elect the Florida Attorney General. Incumbent Republican Attorney General Ashley Moody was reelected for a second term, defeating Democratic challenger Aramis Ayala by a 20-point margin.

Republican primary

Candidates

Declared
Ashley Moody, incumbent Florida Attorney General

Endorsements

Democratic primary

Candidates

Declared
Aramis Ayala, former state attorney for the Ninth Judicial Circuit Court of Florida (2017–2021)
Jim Lewis, lawyer
Daniel Uhlfelder, attorney

Declined
Fentrice Driskell, state representative (endorsed Ayala)
Andrew Warren, former state attorney for the Thirteenth Judicial Circuit Court of Florida

Endorsements

Polling

Results

General election

Predictions

Polling

Ashley Moody vs. generic Democrat

Results

Notes

Partisan clients

See also
 2022 United States attorney general elections
 Florida Attorney General

References

External links 
Florida Division of Elections Candidate Tracking System
Official campaign websites
Aramis Ayala (D) for Attorney General
Ashley Moody (R) for Attorney General

Attorney General
Florida
Florida Attorney General elections